KOLY-FM (99.5 FM, "Star 99") is a radio station licensed to serve Mobridge, South Dakota.  The station is owned by James River Broadcasting, and it airs a hot adult contemporary music format.

All three DRG Media Group (James River Broadcasting) stations in Mobridge share studios at 118 3rd St. East, in Mobridge. The KOLY AM and FM transmitters and the 581 foot tower are east of town, on Highway 12.

The station was assigned the KOLY-FM call letters by the Federal Communications Commission on March 25, 1980.

Personalities
In 2006, sports director Pat Morrison celebrated 50 years on the air at KOLY-AM/FM as the voice of Mobridge High School.

References

External links
KOLY-FM official website

OLY-FM
Hot adult contemporary radio stations in the United States
Walworth County, South Dakota
Radio stations established in 1980